Joseba Andoni Etxeberria Lizardi (born 5 September 1977) is a Spanish retired professional footballer who played mostly as a winger, currently manager of CD Mirandés.

After starting his career at the age of 17 with Real Sociedad, he quickly switched to Athletic Bilbao, going on to spend the rest of his extensive career there.

Exteberria earned 53 caps for Spain, representing the nation at the 1998 World Cup and two European Championships.

Club career
Born in Elgoibar, Gipuzkoa, Etxeberria began his career with Real Sociedad, making his La Liga debut at only 17 in a 2–0 home win against RCD Español on 29 January 1995. That summer, he moved to neighbouring Athletic Bilbao in a controversial transfer that cost over €3 million and caused the clubs to break off formal relations– at the time, it was the highest transfer fee paid for an under-18 player in Spanish football. When he returned to Anoeta Stadium in 2001, the Real Sociedad supporters prepared banners of his face on banknotes denoting him as a 'mercenary', and when he scored they responded with a hail of bottles and verbal abuse which earned the organization a fine from the Royal Spanish Football Federation.

In 1997–98, Etxeberria scored 11 league goals as Athletic finished second, achieving a career-best 14 five seasons later. He netted the goal that took his team into the group stage of the UEFA Champions League as they overcame FC Dinamo Tbilisi on the away goals rule, and repeated the feat in that phase of the competition against Rosenborg BK (1–1 home draw); in his first 12 years he never appeared in less than 28 league games, his lowest scoring output being three in the 2004–05 and 2006–07 campaigns, while he was also eventually awarded team captaincy.

On 1 October 2008, already playing second-fiddle, Etxeberria agreed a deal with the Basque side according to which he effectively played 2009–10, his last season as a professional, for free, after his contract expired in June 2009.

Etxeberria's last year was not a successful one individually as he only appeared in seven league matches, adding another seven with two goals in the season's UEFA Europa League, including his final for the club (a late penalty equaliser) against C.D. Nacional in the group phase of the UEFA Europa League on 5 November 2009. On 15 May 2010, he was replaced to a standing ovation in Athletic's 2–0 home victory over Deportivo de La Coruña, and represented his main club in 514 official matches (104 goals), third-best in its history only behind José Ángel Iribar and Txetxu Rojo.

Etxeberria's testimonial match at the San Mamés Stadium was played against 200 children, and he scored twice in a 5–3 win.

International career
After leading the 1995 FIFA World Youth Championship scoring charts and winning fourth place, Etxeberria moved up to the Spain full national team, making his debut on 19 November 1997 in a friendly against Romania in Palma de Mallorca and scoring in the 1–1 draw. He was capped 53 times and netted 12 goals, representing his country at the 1998 FIFA World Cup, UEFA Euro 2000 and Euro 2004. On 18 June, in the second tournament, he scored the 2–1 winner in the group stage match to defeat Slovenia.

Etxeberria also featured for the unofficial Basque Country side in 11 matches, a record number of appearances at the time which was honoured by the territorial federation upon his retirement.

Coaching career
Etxeberria began a coaching career after retiring, his first job being with the Basque Country representative youth teams. In 2012 he returned to Athletic, starting out at the youth academy; having spent so many years at the club as a player, he described the Lezama training centre as a "second home".

In 2015, Etxeberria moved to the first team under manager Ernesto Valverde. The following year he was appointed at affiliate CD Basconia, controlling a group of players he had previously managed at the Juvenil age group level.

In summer 2017, Etxberria departed from the Athletic internal structure whilst remaining contracted to the club and moved within the same region to become manager of third-tier side SD Amorebieta, replacing the departed Aitor Larrazábal (a former Athletic teammate and coaching colleague). On 5 February of the following year, he replaced fired José Luis Martí at the helm of CD Tenerife.

In May 2018, Athletic Bilbao confirmed that Etxeberria had cut all ties with the club to continue his coaching career independently. On 17 September, he was fired by Tenerife after the team failed to record a victory in the first five league matches of the season.

Etxeberria returned to the Athletic Bilbao staff in late May 2019, now as head coach of the reserve team Bilbao Athletic, on a two-year contract. On 14 February 2022, he replaced Lolo Escobar at the helm of CD Mirandés in the Segunda División.

Personal life
Etxeberria was not related to former Athletic teammate Imanol Etxeberria. Coincidentally, they were raised just a few miles from one another (Imanol hailed from Bergara).

Career statistics

Club

International

Scores and results list Spaon's goal tally first, score column indicates score after each Etxeberria goal.

Managerial statistics

See also
List of Athletic Bilbao players (+200 appearances)
List of La Liga players (400+ appearances)

References

External links

1977 births
Living people
People from Elgoibar
Spanish footballers
Footballers from the Basque Country (autonomous community)
Association football wingers
Association football forwards
La Liga players
Segunda División B players
Real Sociedad B footballers
Real Sociedad footballers
Athletic Bilbao footballers
Spain youth international footballers
Spain under-21 international footballers
Spain international footballers
1998 FIFA World Cup players
UEFA Euro 2000 players
UEFA Euro 2004 players
Basque Country international footballers
Spanish football managers
Segunda División managers
Segunda División B managers
Tercera División managers
CD Basconia managers
SD Amorebieta managers
CD Tenerife managers
Athletic Bilbao B managers
CD Mirandés managers
Athletic Bilbao non-playing staff